Lars-Christer Olsson (born 1950) from Sweden was UEFA chief executive from 7 November 2003 until he resigned on 1 February 2007. He was succeeded by Gianni Infantino from Switzerland.

References

1950 births
Living people
Swedish sports executives and administrators
UEFA officials